Existenz may refer to:

 Existenz, a 1999 science fiction film
 Existenz (journal), an Open Source journal sponsored by the Karl Jaspers Society of North America
 Existenz (Jaspers), a philosophical term introduced by Karl Jaspers

See also

 Existence